Ophir Township is located in LaSalle County, Illinois. As of the 2010 census, its population was 508 and it contained 201 housing units. Ophir Township was originally named Fremont Township, but was renamed in May, 1850.

Geography

Demographics

References

External links
US Census
City-data.com
Illinois State Archives

Townships in LaSalle County, Illinois
Populated places established in 1850
Townships in Illinois
1850 establishments in Illinois